The 2012 Silverstone GP2 Series round was a GP2 Series motor race held on 7 and 8 July 2012 at Silverstone Circuit in Silverstone, United Kingdom. It was the seventh round of the 2012 GP2 Season.

Mexican Esteban Gutierrez won the feature race while Brazilian Luiz Razia won the sprint race. Series leader Valsecchi was penalized and sent to the back of the starting grid due to the infringement of a technical regulation related to the quantity of fuel available after the qualifying session. As a result, Razia ended up leading the GP2 Championship after Silverstone.

Classification

Qualifying

Notes
 — Stefano Coletti, Felipe Nasr and Marcus Ericsson were all excluded from qualifying for technical irregularities, and moved to the back of the grid.
 — Giedo van der Garde was given a ten-place grid penalty for overtaking another car during a red-flag period.
 — Davide Valsecchi was given a ten-place grid penalty for overtaking another car during a red-flag period, but was then found to be in violation of the same regulation as Coletti, Nasr and Ericsson, and was moved to the back of the grid.

Feature race

Sprint race

Standings after the round

Drivers' Championship standings

Teams' Championship standings

 Note: Only the top five positions are included for both sets of standings.

See also 
 2012 British Grand Prix
 2012 Silverstone GP3 Series round

Footnotes

References

Silverstone
Silverstone